Lilibeth del Carmen Chacón García (born 1 March 1992) is a Venezuelan racing cyclist. She competed in the 2012 UCI women's road race in Valkenburg aan de Geul and in the 2013 UCI women's road race in Florence.

Career results
2014
Copa Venezuela
2nd Individual Pursuit
2nd Points Race
3rd Scratch Race
3rd  Team Pursuit, Pan American Track Championships (with Yennifer Cesar, Zuralmy Rivas and Angie Sabrina Gonzalez)
3rd  Points Race, Central American and Caribbean Games
2016
Copa Venezuela
1st Points Race
2nd Individual Pursuit
2021 
 1st  Overall Vuelta a Colombia Femenina
1st Stages 1, 3 (ITT), 4 & 5

References

External links
 

1992 births
Living people
Venezuelan female cyclists
People from Táchira
Central American and Caribbean Games bronze medalists for Venezuela
Competitors at the 2014 Central American and Caribbean Games
Central American and Caribbean Games medalists in cycling
Cyclists at the 2011 Pan American Games
Cyclists at the 2019 Pan American Games
Pan American Games competitors for Venezuela
21st-century Venezuelan women
Competitors at the 2018 Central American and Caribbean Games